The 2022 Settimana Internazionale di Coppi e Bartali was a road cycling stage race that took place between 22 and 26 March 2022 in the Italian region of Emilia-Romagna and in San Marino. The race was rated as a category 2.1 event on the 2022 UCI Europe Tour calendar, and was the 37th edition of the Settimana Internazionale di Coppi e Bartali.

Teams 
Ten of the 18 UCI WorldTeams, five UCI ProTeams, eight UCI Continental teams, and the Italian national team made up the 24 teams that participated in the race. Of these teams, 16 entered a full squad of seven riders. Four teams (and ) each entered six riders, three teams (and ) each entered five riders, and only one team entered four riders. Of the 155 riders who started the race, 99 finished.

UCI WorldTeams

 
 
 
 
 
 
 
 
 
 

UCI ProTeams

 
 
 
 
 

UCI Continental Teams

 
 
 
 
 
 
 
 

National Teams

 Italy

Route

Stages

Stage 1 
22 March 2022 — Riccione to Riccione,

Stage 2 
23 March 2022 — Riccione to Longiano,

Stage 3 
24 March 2022 — City of San Marino (San Marino) to City of San Marino,

Stage 4 
25 March 2022 — Montecatini Terme to Montecatini Terme,

Stage 5 
26 March 2022 — Casalguidi to Cantagrillo,

Classification leadership table 

 On stage 2, Eddie Dunbar, who was second in the points classification, wore the red jersey, because first-placed Mauro Schmid wore the white jersey as the leader of the general classification. For the same reason, Ethan Hayter, who was second in the young rider classification, wore the orange jersey.
 On stage 3, Edoardo Zardini, who was second in the mountains classification, wore the red jersey, because first-placed Eddie Dunbar wore the white jersey as the leader of the general classification.
 On stage 3, Ben Tulett, who was second in the young rider classification, wore the orange jersey, because first-placed Ethan Hayter wore the red jersey as the leader of the points classification.
 On stage 4, Marc Hirschi, who was second in the young rider classification, wore the orange jersey, because first-placed Ben Tulett wore the red jersey as the leader of the points classification.

Final classification standings

General classification

Points classification

Mountains classification

Young rider classification

Team classification

References

Sources

External links 
  

2022
Settimana Internazionale di Coppi e Bartali
Settimana Internazionale di Coppi e Bartali
Settimana Internazionale di Coppi e Bartali